James H. Collins (1921 – May 21, 1982) was a Canadian curler. He played as second on the 1954 Brier-winning Team Alberta, skipped by Matt Baldwin. He died at the age of 60 in 1982.

References

1921 births
1982 deaths
Brier champions
Curlers from Alberta
Canadian male curlers